Zsolt Szekeres (born 12 July 1975) is a Hungarian football player.

References

European Football Clubs & Squads
HLSZ

1975 births
Living people
Hungarian footballers
Expatriate footballers in the Faroe Islands
Fehérvár FC players
FC Tatabánya players
Gázszer FC footballers
Pécsi MFC players
Association football defenders